Nathaniel Pierre Jones, better known by his stage name DJ Pierre, is an American DJ and performer of house music based in Chicago. He helped to develop the house music subgenre of acid house, as member of Phuture, whose 1987 EP Acid Tracks, is considered the first acid-house recording. Allmusic.com calls Jones a crucial DJ and the production wizard partly responsible for the development of Chicago acid-house. Jones' first single, "Generate Power", became standard fare for scores of producers during the next few years. Philippe Renaud, a journalist for La Presse in Montreal, states that the term acid house was coined in Chicago in 1987 to describe the sound of the Roland 303 bass machine, which made its first significant recording appearance on Phuture's Acid Trax (DJ Pierre) in that year.

Musical career

Phuture

Jones has recorded under the names Audio Clash, Darkman, Disco Fuhrer, DJ Pierre, DJ Pierre's Afro Acid Project, Doomsday, M & M, Nathaniel Pierre Jones, One Screaming Idiot, P-Ditty, Pfantasia, Photon Inc., Phugitive, Phuture Scope, Pierre's Pfantasy Club, Raving Lunatics, the Don, Time Warp, X Fade, and Yvette. He formed the group Phuture with his friends Spanky (Earl Smith Jr. –founder/technical producer) and Herb J (Herbert R Jackson Jr. - keyboards). During the mid-1980s, the trio began using the squelch sound that became common in Acid House recordings after the group's initial experiments with a Roland TB-303 bass line synthesizer. Living in the Chicago area, they were exposed to many house artists, such as Hot Mix 5 artists (Farley "Jackmaster" Funk, Ralphi "The Razz" Rosario, Kenny "Jammin" Jason, Mickey "Mixin" Oliver, and Scott "Smokin" Seals) who were producing many tapes and vinyl recordings. Frankie Knuckles was DJing and the Warehouse club (from where house music may have derived its name).

First recordings
Pierre and Spanky had been to Chicago DJ Ron Hardy's club called Muzic Box. The first Acid House track the group recorded was "Acid Tracks" (renamed by Ron Hardy from its original title, "In Your Mind"), which had a slow burning, bass-heavy, deep sound, and that was over eleven minutes long. Their first track was put on tape and first played in the Music Box club in the mid-1980s. Ron Hardy played it several times on its first night. It was rerecorded at Trax Records (produced by Marshall Jefferson) and released in 1986.

DJ Pierre went on to record many of the early Acid House tracks on Trax Records under the names Phuture, Phuture Pfantasy Club, Pierre's Pfantasy Club (with Felix Da Housecat), and Phortune with songs such as "Your Only Friend," "The Creator," "String Free," "Got the Bug," "Box Energy," "Dream Girl," "Mystery Girl," "Fantasy Girl," "We are Phuture," "Slam," and "Spank Spank." One of the tracks has a voiceover proclaiming "We are the creator of acid music, and we're back." DJ Pierre's track "Your Only Friend" has an anti-drug message.

Post-Chicago
In 1990, DJ Pierre moved away from Chicago, where the house-music scene was slowing down and joined Strictly Rhythm records, where he was also briefly the A&R manager. One of the problems that DJ Pierre and other Chicago house-music artists faced was that they did not usually own their own copyrights; the music they produced was sometimes exported and licensed overseas, and they were not able to share in these revenues. Other hits he released since leaving Chicago include "Generate Power" by Photon Inc, "Follow Me" by Aly-Us, and "The Horn Song" featuring Barbara Tucker, later released as "Everybody Dance (The Horn Song)." He is still DJing and producing; on January 14, 2007, he appeared on Pete Tong's Essential Mix on British BBC Radio 1. Tong inducted DJ Pierre into his dance music Hall of Fame in 2013. He appeared on the Essential Mix program again in 2017. In 2011, he released the Track "Alpha Omega" together with Kris Menace on the PIAS sub-label Different.

References

External links
 DJ Pierre Official Website
 Phuture on Discogs.com
 DJ Pierre on Resident Advisor

African-American musicians
American DJs
American house musicians
Acid house musicians
House musicians
House music
House DJs
DJs from Chicago
Musicians from Chicago
Living people
Year of birth missing (living people)
Electronic dance music DJs
21st-century African-American people